Chroomonadaceae is a family of cryptomonads first recognized by Clay et al in 1999 as including genera Chroomonas, Falcomonas, and Komma. Following a molecular phylogenic study in 2002, Hemiselmis was also placed within the Chroomonadaceae. Today, the family is generally recognized as sister to the Pyrenomonadaceae.

They are one of only two groups of cryptomonads (alongside Rhinomonas) to lack a rhizostyle. They are also distinguished by the lack of a cleavage furrow and the presence of several phycocyanins and phycoerythrins not observed in any other cryptomonad taxa.

Taxonomy 

Laza-Martinez, 2012

References 

Cryptomonads